Edalat Qeshlaqi (also Romanized as ‘Edālat Qeshlāqī; also known as Ḩājjī ‘Edālat) is a village in Ojarud-e Shomali Rural District, in the Central District of Germi County, Ardabil Province, Iran. Sina Edalat; At the 2006 census, its population was 93, in 18 families.

References 

Towns and villages in Germi County